Shi Shengjie (3 April 1953 – 28 September 2018) was a Chinese xiangsheng comedian.

Biography
Shi was born in Heping District of Tianjin, China, on 3 April   1953, to Shi Shiyuan and Gao Xiuqin, both were well-known xiangsheng performers in Tianjin and Beijing. At the age of 6, Shi moved to Harbin, Heilongjiang to live with his father. He then studied xiangsheng under Zhu Xiangchen.

In late 1965, Shi's father committed suicide because of persecution at the early stage of the Cultural Revolution, and his elder brother was denounced as a "counterrevolutionary". In August 1969, Shi became a sent-down youth and worked at Heilongjiang Production and Construction Corps. In 1975, he began performing xiangsheng with Jiang Kun, a renowned xiangsheng comedian. In 1984, he became the last disciple of Hou Baolin, one of the most popular and influential xiangsheng performers in the PRC era. Shi had appeared in the CCTV New Year's Gala show since 1989.

On 28 September 2018, Shi died of liver cancer in Harbin, Heilongjiang.

Personal life
In June 1981, Shi married Song Yan. The couple had a daughter named Shi Yiwen.

References

1953 births
2018 deaths
Chinese male comedians
Deaths from liver cancer
Chinese xiangsheng performers
Male actors from Tianjin
Sent-down youths